The 2008 World University Boxing Championships took place in Kazan, Russia between September 19-28, 2008. The championship was staged in eleven weight categories. 94 boxers and 38 officials from 16 countries participated at the championship.

Participating nations

Results
Bronze medals are awarded to both losing semi-finalists.

Medal count table

See also
 World University Championships

References

3rd World University Boxing Championship

World University Boxing Championships
World University
World University
Boxing
Boxing
Boxing
Box